Foster Hutchinson Jr. (1761-28 November 1815) was a member of the 9th General Assembly of Nova Scotia representing Halifax Township 1806-1811, was appointed to the Nova Scotia Council in 1813, and was appointed a Puisne judge of the Supreme Court of Nova Scotia in 1810.

He was the only son of Foster Hutchinson, Sr., the nephew of Governor of Massachusetts Thomas Hutchinson and grandchild of Governor of Nova Scotia Paul Mascarene.  He arrived in Halifax from Boston with his father as Loyalists (1776).  Hutchinson became a lawyer and worked under Chief Justice Thomas Andrew Lumisden Strange.  Sir George Prévost appointed him an Assistant Justice to the Supreme Court (1809).  He is buried in the Old Burying Ground (Halifax, Nova Scotia).

See also 
Nova Scotia in the American Revolution

References 

History of Nova Scotia
1815 deaths
Year of birth missing
Place of birth missing
Place of death missing
Loyalists who settled Nova Scotia
Colony of Nova Scotia judges
People from Boston
American Loyalists from Massachusetts
Nova Scotia pre-Confederation MLAs